Kirillovsky (masculine), Kirillovskaya (feminine), or Kirillovskoye (neuter) may refer to:
Kirillovsky District, a district of Vologda Oblast, Russia
Kirillovsky (rural locality) (Kirillovskaya, Kirillovskoye), several rural localities in Russia

See also
Kirillov (disambiguation)